International Junior Hockey League  was an independent  Junior B ice hockey league. The League had teams in New England and Mid Atlantic United States.

League History
The league formed in 2005 out of the Interstate Junior Hockey League with teams based in the Northeastern United States and expanded over the next few seasons. Charlie Nielsen is the commissioner of the league.

In December 2011, the Northern New York Gamblers of Massena, New York opted to leave the IJHL.

In July 2012, the ijhl folded after the "Super Elite" league went under. Most of the "Super Elite" league members decided to create a new league called the Northern States Junior Hockey League (NSHL) so they could resume play in the fall.

Teams
 the IJHL lists the following members. The Super Elite League is the IJHL's Jr B league, the Elite league is on par with Jr C.

Elite League

See also
List of ice hockey leagues

External links and References
 IJHL.com Official Website

Junior ice hockey leagues in the United States